Jacks Run is a  long 3rd order tributary to Sewickley Creek in Westmoreland County, Pennsylvania.

Course
Jacks Run rises about 0.5 miles southwest of Hannastown, Pennsylvania, and then flows southwest to join Sewickley Creek at Youngwood.

Watershed
Jacks Run drains  of area, receives about 42.2 in/year of precipitation, has a wetness index of 378.89, and is about 34% forested.

References

 
Tributaries of the Ohio River
Rivers of Pennsylvania
Rivers of Westmoreland County, Pennsylvania
Allegheny Plateau